The tables below list the FIS Cross-Country World Cup champions. The medalists are the three contestants with the highest total scores at the end of the cross-country skiing World Cup season. The list extends from 1973–74 onwards for overall men, 1978–79 onwards for overall women, 1996–97 onwards for sprint and distance (both genders), as well as Nations Cup winners beginning for 1981–82.

Men

Overall

1 Unofficial WC
2 Trial WC
Medals:

Sprint

Medals:

Distance 

¹ arranged under the name of "Long Distance World Cup"
Medals:

Women
See the List of IOC country codes for expansions of country abbreviations.

Overall

1 Trial WC
2 Marja-Liisa Kirvesniemi née Hämälainen married Harri Kirvesniemi
3 Bente Skari née Martinsen married Geir Skari in 1999
Medals:

Sprint 

1 Bente Skari née Martinsen married Geir Skari in 1999
Medals:

Distance 

¹ arranged under the name of "Long Distance World Cup"
Medals:

Nations Cup 

All results of female and male athletes of a nation are counted for the Nations Cup.

See also
List of Olympic medalists in cross-country skiing
FIS Nordic World Ski Championships

External links
 Ranking of the podium places in the world cup (Women) 
 Ranking of the podium places in the world cup (Men)

Champions
FIS Cross-Country World Cup champions
Skiing